Hospital Velho is a settlement in the eastern part of Príncipe Island in São Tomé and Príncipe. It lies east of the island capital Santo António, on the coast. Its population is 335 (2012 census).

Population history

References

Populated places in the Autonomous Region of Príncipe